Messier 28 or M28, also known as NGC 6626, is a globular cluster of stars in the center-west of Sagittarius. It was discovered by French astronomer Charles Messier in 1764. He briefly described it as a "nebula containing no star... round, seen with difficulty in 3-foot telescope; Diam 2′."

In the sky it is less than a degree to the northwest of the 3rd magnitude star Kaus Borealis (Lambda ). This cluster is faintly visible as a hazy patch with a pair of binoculars and can be readily found in a small telescope with an  aperture, showing as a nebulous feature spanning 11.2 arcminutes. Larger telescopes will provide greater resolution, one of  revealing a dense 2′ core, with more density within.

It is about 18,300 light-years away from Earth.

It bore the first discovery of a millisecond pulsar in a globular cluster – PSR B1821–24. This was using the Lovell Telescope at Jodrell Bank Observatory, England. A total of 11 further of these have since been detected in it with the telescope at Green Bank Observatory, West Virginia. As of 2011, these number the third-most in a cluster tied to the Milky Way, following Terzan 5 and 47 Tucanae.

Gallery

See also
 List of Messier objects

References and footnotes

References

Footnotes

External links

 Globular Cluster M28 @ SEDS Messier pages
 Messier 28, Galactic Globular Clusters Database page
 

Messier 028
Messier 028
Messier 028
028
17640727